The Euro Banking Association (EBA) is an industry forum for the European payments industry with close to 200 member banks and organisations from the European Union and around the world aimed at fostering and driving pan-European payment initiatives. Through its industry initiatives and the euro payment systems it has delivered, the EBA is a key contributor to the creation of a standardised Single Euro Payments Area (SEPA).

History and structure 
The Euro Banking Association (EBA) was founded in Paris in 1985 by 18 commercial banks and the European Investment Bank. The European Commission as well as the Bank for International Settlements (BIS) supported the founding of the EBA. Since then, the number of members has risen to almost 200. The institutions come from all member states of the European Union as well as from Norway, Switzerland, Australia, China, Japan, the United Arab Emirates and the United States.

In its early years, the agenda of the EBA included the promotion of the European Monetary Union (EMU) and the development and management of a private industry ECU clearing system stretching across Europe.

For the start of the EMU, the EBA delivered EURO1, a RTGS-equivalent large-value payment system for single euro transactions. The EBA also developed STEP1, a payment service for single euro payments of high priority and urgency for small and medium-sized banks, and STEP2, a Pan-European Automated Clearing House (PE-ACH), which processes euro retail payments. All three payment systems are run by EBA Clearing.

References 
 EBA CLEARING
 MyBank
 EBAday
 The Payment System

External links

 

Banking in the European Union
Business and finance professional associations
1985 establishments in France
Organizations based in Paris
French companies established in 1985